Reuben Robert Joakim Sallmander (born 11 February 1966) is a Swedish actor and singer of Jewish heritage.

Early life and education 
Sallmander was born in Högalid, Stockholm, and attended the Jewish school.  He spent two years at a kibbutz in Israel. He graduated from the Swedish National Academy of Mime and Acting in 1990.

Career 
He has since acted in a wide array of theatre plays, films and television productions. In 2013, he appeared in Crimes of Passion. In 2015 he played a key character in season 3 of the internationally acclaimed Danish-Swedish TV crime series The Bridge.

Filmography

References

Notes

External links

1966 births
Living people
Singers from Stockholm
Swedish male actors
Swedish male singers
Swedish Jews